This is a list of pastries, which are small buns made using a stiff dough enriched with fat. Some dishes, such as pies, are made of a pastry casing that covers or completely contains a filling of various sweet or savory ingredients.

There are five basic types of pastry dough (a food that combines flour and fat); these are shortcrust pastry, filo pastry, choux pastry, flaky pastry and puff pastry. Two main types of pastry dough are nonlaminated, when fat is cut or rubbed into the flour, and laminated, when fat is repeatedly folded into the dough using a technique called lamination. An example of a nonlaminated pastry would be a pie or tart crust and brioche. An example of a laminated pastry would be a croissant, danish, or puff pastry. Many pastries are prepared using shortening, a fat food product that is solid at room temperature, the composition of which lends to creating crumbly, shortcrust-style pastries and pastry crusts.

Pastries were first created by the ancient Egyptians. The classical period of ancient Greece and Rome had pastries made with almonds, flour, honey and seeds. The introduction of sugar into European cookery resulted in a large variety of new pastry recipes in France, Italy, Spain and Switzerland.  The greatest innovator was Marie-Antoine Carême who perfected puff pastry and developed elaborate designs of pâtisserie.


Pastries

Unsorted
 Apfelküchle
 Carolina
 Chebakia
 Coventry Godcakes
 Ghunzakhi
 Gukhwappang
 Osmanthus cake
 Shorgoghal

See also

 Chinese bakery products
 Cuisine
 Global cuisine
 List of baked goods
 List of bread rolls
 List of breads
 List of buns
 List of cakes
 List of choux pastry dishes
 List of desserts
 List of doughnut varieties
 List of hors d'oeuvre
 List of pies, tarts and flans
 Lists of prepared foods
 List of sweet breads

References

External links

 Pastry entry at Encyclopædia Britannica
 Pastry Dough – Types at Crafty Baking

Dessert-related lists
Lists of foods by type